Oranjestad may refer to:
 Oranjestad, Aruba, the capital of Aruba
 Oranjestad, Sint Eustatius, until 10 October 2010 part of the Netherlands Antilles, now part of the Netherlands
 City with a strong connection to the House of Orange-Nassau, particularly members of the Unie van Oranjesteden (Union of Orange Cities):
 Breda, Netherlands
 Buren, Netherlands
 Diest, Belgium
 Dillenburg, Germany
 Orange, Vaucluse, France
 Steenbergen, Netherlands

See also
 Orange City (disambiguation)